Michael II served as Greek Patriarch of Alexandria between 870 and 903.

References

10th-century deaths
9th-century Patriarchs of Alexandria
10th-century Patriarchs of Alexandria
10th-century Christian saints
Year of birth unknown
People from the Tulunid dynasty